Jane Cvetkovski (born 29 August 1987) is a retired Macedonian handball player.

References

http://ekipa.mk/jane-tsvetkovski-potpisha-za-slovachki-agro-topolchani/
http://sportmedia.mk/rakomet/internacionalci/cvetkovski-e-glaven-adut-na-rk-bosna-pishuvame-nova-istorija
http://www.gol.mk/rakomet/cvetkovski-potpisha-za-shvedski-ov-helsinborg

1987 births
Living people
Macedonian male handball players
Sportspeople from Skopje